Limassol (or ) is a city on the southern coast of Cyprus and capital of the district with the same name. Limassol is the second largest urban area in Cyprus after Nicosia, with an urban population of 183,658 and a metropolitan population of 239,842. 

In 2014, Limassol was ranked by TripAdvisor as the 3rd up-and-coming destination in the world, in its Top 10 Traveler's Choice Destinations on the Rise list. The city is also ranked 89th worldwide in Mercer's Quality of Living Survey (2017). 

In the 2020 ranking published by the Globalization and World Cities Research Network, Limassol was classified as a "Gamma −" global city.

History
Limassol was built between two ancient Greek cities, Amathus and Kourion, and during Byzantine rule it was known as Neapolis (new town). Limassol's historical centre is located around its medieval Limassol Castle and the Old Port. Today the city spreads along the Mediterranean coast and has extended much farther than the castle and port, with its suburbs stretching along the coast to Amathus. To the west of the city is the Akrotiri Area of the British Overseas Territory of Akrotiri and Dhekelia.

Ancient

The city of Limassol is situated between the ancient cities of Amathus and Kourion (Curium). Limassol was probably built after Amathus had been ruined. However, the town of Limassol has been inhabited since very ancient times. Graves found there date back to 2000 BC and others date back to the 8th and 4th centuries BC. These few remains show that a small colonisation must have existed which did not manage to develop and flourish. Ancient writers mention nothing about the foundation of the town.
In 85 BC,  Armenian emperor Tigranes the Great ( Tigran Mets;  Tigránes ho Mégas) had reached Limassol in order to establish security and protection of local Greek allies against Rome in a result followed by his conquest of Syria, Lebanon and Anatolia.

According to the Council of Chalcedon which took place in 451, the local bishop as well as the bishops of Amathus and Arsinoe were involved in the foundation of the city, which would be known by the names of Theodosiana and Neapolis. Bishop Leontios of Neapolis was an important church writer in the 7th century. The records of the 7th Synod (757) refer to it as the bishop's see. The town was known as Lemesos in the 10th century.

Medieval

The history of Limassol is largely known by the events associated with the Third Crusade. The king of England, Richard the Lionheart, was travelling to the Holy Land in 1190. His fiancée (Berengaria) and his sister (Joan, Queen of Sicily) were also travelling there but on a different ship. Due to a storm, the ship with the queens arrived in Limassol. Isaac Komnenos, the renegade Byzantine Greek governor of Cyprus, invited the noblewomen ashore, with the intention of holding them for ransom, but they refused. So he refused them fresh water and they had to put out to sea again or yield to capture. When Richard arrived in Limassol and met Isaac Komnenos, he asked him to contribute to the crusade for the liberation of the Holy Land. At the beginning Isaac agreed but later on refused. Richard finally arrested him; the entire island was therefore taken over by the Anglo-Normans, bringing the long Byzantine dominion of Cyprus to an end. Richard celebrated his marriage with Berengaria who had received the crown as queen of England in Cyprus. Richard destroyed Amathus and the inhabitants were transferred to Limassol.

A year later, in AD 1191 Cyprus was sold for the sum of 100,000 bezants to the Templars, rich monks and soldiers whose aim was the protection of the Holy Sepulchre in Jerusalem. 

The knights enforced high taxes, in order to get back the money that had been given for the purchase of Cyprus. This led to the revolt of the Cypriots, who wished to get rid of the bond of the promise. Richard accepted their request and a new purchaser was found: Guy de Lusignan, a Roman Catholic from Poitou. Cyprus was therefore handed over to the French dynasty of the house of Lusignan, thus establishing the medieval Kingdom of Cyprus.

For a period of about three centuries 1175–1489, Limassol enjoyed remarkable prosperity. Cyprus was characterised by its great number of Latin bishops. This lasted until the occupation of Cyprus by the Ottomans in AD 1570. Latin battalions which established monasteries were settled down there. The settlement of merchants in Cyprus and particularly in Limassol in the 13th century led to the financial welfare of its inhabitants. Its harbour as a centre of transportation and commerce, contributed greatly to the financial and cultural development.

Venetian rule
Cyprus was sold in 1489 to Venice by the Cypriot Queen Catherine Cornaro. The Venetians strengthened the Castle of Limassol.

Ottoman Empire

The Ottoman Empire invaded Cyprus in 1570–1577 and occupied it. Limassol was conquered in July 1570 without any resistance.

Some neighbourhoods, mostly to the east of the city were predominantly Greek, to the west predominantly Turkish with an evenly mixed area around the castle. The church played an important role in the education of Greeks during the years 1754–1821. During those years, new schools were set up in all the towns. Greek intellectuals used to teach Greek history, Turkish and French. The following schools operated in the town of Limassol:
 The Greek School which was established in 1819.
 The first public school which was established in 1841.
 The Girls’ School which was established in 1861.

British Colonial administration

The British took over in Cyprus in 1878. The first British governor of Limassol was Colonel Warren. He showed a particular interest in Limassol and even from the first days the condition of the town showed an improvement. The roads were cleaned, the animals were removed from the centre, roads were fixed, trees were planted and docks were constructed for the loading and unloading of those ships that were anchored off-shore. Lanterns for the lighting of the central areas were also installed in the 1880s. In 1912, electricity replaced the old lanterns.

From the first years of the British occupation, a post office, a telegraph office and a hospital began to operate. In 1880, the first printing press started working. It was in this printing press that the newspapers Alithia and Anagennisis were published in 1897. The newspaper Salpinx was published at the same time.

At the end of the 19th century, the very first hotels began to operate. Among these were Europe and Amathus. These changes that the British brought about contributed to the development of an intellectual and artistic life. Schools, theatres, clubs, art galleries, music halls, sport societies, football clubs etc. were all set up and meant a great deal to the cultural life of Limassol.

Politics and government

The first Marxist groups in Cyprus formed in Limassol in the early 1920s; in 1926, the Communist party of Cyprus was formed in the city. Its successor, AKEL, has dominated municipal elections since the first free elections in 1943, won by Ploutis Servas.

The European People's Party held an extraordinary party summit in Limassol in 2013. The list of participants in the summit included European Council members, government representatives, European Commission representatives, opposition members and leaders, and European Parliament representatives. The summit's agenda included topics such as the EU's multi-annual financial framework for the period 2014–2020 and the preparation for the 2014 European elections.
Notably, Andreas Christou, a Progressive Party of Working People member, was re-elected mayor of Limassol in December 2011 to serve his second five-year term.

Education

There are over a hundred educational institutions in the city. Limassol hosts Saint Mary's school, a Catholic private school open to all religions and races, as well as other private schools, such as The Grammar School Limassol, American Academy, The Heritage Private School and Foley's Grammar School.

In addition to the various Greek-speaking Elementary schools, Limassol is home to the Limassol Nareg Armenian school.

Furthermore, Limassol is the base of Cyprus University of Technology one of three state universities, which was established in 2004.

Transport
Public transport in Limassol is served by buses. Limassol is connected to other cities in Cyprus via intercity buses.

The city is a highway hub, Limassol crosses some motorways:
 A1 motorway to the north, to Nicosia
 A5 motorway to the east, to Larnaca and Famagusta
 A6 motorway to the west, to Paphos
Also, there is also B8 road from city to Troodos Mountains in north.

The city is close to two international airports: Larnaca International Airport (situated ~ north-east from city) and Paphos International Airport (situated ~ north-west from city).

Port of Limassol is main seaport in Cyprus.

Climate
Limassol has a subtropical-mediterranean climate (Köppen climate classification: Csa) with hot and dry summers and mild winters, which are separated by short springs and autumns which are generally warm and sunny. From December to March the weather is unsettled and can be rainy and windy. Sunshine averages around 6 hours a day. Rain tends to be heavy this time of the year and thunderstorms occur often though they usually do not last for a long time.

Snow in Limassol is a very rare occurrence and usually falls mixed with rain every 7 to 13 years. Snow mixed with rain fell in February 2004, in January 2008 and in February 2012. In spring the weather is mild to warm and pleasant. Rain showers and thunderstorms are common especially in late March and April. Sometimes during the spring dust comes from the Sahara desert which degrades air quality in the city. Summer for Limassol is the longest season of the year, and lasts about six months; it begins in May and ends in October. At this time of the year the weather is sunny every day and rain is rare. In June sea mist can sometimes occur, usually resolving early in the morning. Autumn is warm and usually sunny. It begins in the end of November and in December.

Hail is rare and usually falls between October and April.

Economy

The development of tourism in Limassol began after 1974 when Famagusta and Kyrenia, the principal tourist resorts of Cyprus, were occupied in the Turkish invasion of Cyprus. Limassol has many beaches, suitable for sunbathing and swimming. A bathing beach with all the necessary facilities, provided by the Cyprus Tourism Organisation (CTO), is operating in the town of Limassol, in Dasoudi area.

The Port of Limassol became the major sea port of the Republic of Cyprus in 1974. Before 1974, that role had been filled by Famagusta, which is now located in Northern Cyprus, and is not recognised as a legal port by any country except Turkey.

Limassol is the base for many of the island's wine companies, serving the wine-growing regions on the southern slopes of the Troodos Mountains including Commandaria. Companies include KEO, LOEL, SODAP and ETKO. Wines and cognacs (brandies) that are produced by the grapes here have won several awards in international exhibitions. There is a considerable consumption of wine products in Cyprus by the locals and the foreign visitors. Large quantities are exported to Europe.

The town of Limassol is the biggest industrial centre of the province. There are about 350 industrial units with 90 industry wares. These industries concern dressmaking, furniture, shoes, drinks, food, prints, metal industry, electric devices, plastic wares as well as many other different industries.

Limassol is an important trade centre of Cyprus. This is due to the presence of the UK sovereign base at Episkopi and Akrotiri, and to the displacement of the population in Limassol after the Turkish invasion in 1974. The trade markets are gathered in the centre of the town and in the tourist area along the coast that begins from the old harbour and ends in Amathus area. Most of the hotels, restaurants, confectioneries, discos and places of entertainment in general, are to be found in this area.

Limassol has two ports, commonly referred to as the "old port" and the "new port". The new port has the greatest commercial and passenger flow of traffic and it is the biggest port in the Republic of Cyprus. It is thus normally used by fishing boats. It is able to receive about ten ships depending on their size.
Exports of grapes, wines, carobs, citrus fruits and imports of cereals, vehicles, machines, textiles, agricultural medicines, fertilizers, iron etc. are exported and imported through these ports.

A marina located to the west of Limassol Castle, between the old and new ports, has been built. This new development allows berthing of ocean-going yachts and was opened to public in 2014, having hosted its first yachts in 2013. The marina has a capacity of 1,000 vessels.

During the last years, Limassol has experienced a construction boom fuelled by the tourist sector as well as from increasing foreign investments in the city. Public projects like the redesigning of the city's  promenade, are improving the quality of life of the people and the image of the city as a cosmopolitan destination. Infrastructure improvements partly funded by European programmes have helped solve traffic problems that the city faced with the construction of new highway flyovers and roundabouts.

The Port of Limassol is one of the busiest ports in the Mediterranean transit trade and the largest port in Cyprus. It has also become one of the most important tourism, trade, and service-providing centres in the area. Limassol is home to the Cyprus University of Technology. A number of museums and archaeological sites are available to visitors. Limassol attracts a wide range of tourists mostly during an extended summer season to be accommodated in a wide range of hotels and apartments. A large marina lies near the old town,  from the Limassol medieval castle.

Limassol Riviera [http://city.sigmalive.com/gallery/10211/i-aktogrammi-tis-lemesoy-apo-psila] is going through a major construction boom phase, that first began in late 2013, when legislation was passed encouraging construction. Ever since, hundreds of new housing units and mushrooming businesses, are introduced to the Cypriot community each year.[https://imvaluers.com/limassol-upcoming-skyline-fears/] Currently, there are over 70 buildings that are proposed and/or under construction, that will stand taller than 50m upon completion, out of which the 32 are skyscrapers. Amongst the under construction projects, is the One high-rise residential building, where once completed, it will be Cyprus' tallest tower and Europe's tallest seafront residential building. Under construction is also the 'City of Dreams Mediterranean' which is going to be Europe's largest casino resort.

Demographics

Internal migration since the 1960s and influx of displaced persons after 1974 significantly increased the population of Limassol and its suburbs. Greater Limassol today includes the municipality of Limassol (includes the suburb of Agia Fyla) and the municipalities of Polemidia, Mesa Geitonia, Agios Athanasios, Germasogeia and Ypsonas.

Limassol traditionally had a mixed population of Greek, Turkish Cypriots and Armenian Cypriots. The majority of Turkish Cypriots moved to the north in 1974. Accordingly, many Greek Cypriots from the north of Cyprus, who became refugees following the Turkish invasion, settled down in Limassol. During the 1990s several Cypriot Romani people (considered Turkish Cypriots according to the constitution) returned from the North of the island to the Turkish quarter of Limassol. Armenians remained in Limassol and continued residence in surroundings of Sourp Kevork Armenian Apostolic Church and maintain an elementary school named Nareg (Նարեկ Հայկական Վարժարան). There is also an Armenian village in Limassol District named Armenochori.

The rise of the population birth rate during the late 19th and 20th centuries (1878–1960) was 70%. The number of inhabitants was 6,131 in 1881, while in 1960 the number had risen to 43,593. The number of the Greek population was estimated at 37,478, while the Turkish population at 6,115.

Limassol is home to a large community of Pontic Greeks, who settled in Cyprus after the collapse of the Soviet Union.

In recent years, the city has also become increasingly popular with Russian or other post-Soviet nationals and expatriates. Today, some 17% of the population of Limassol are Russian-speaking, and 8% of the population are Russian citizens.

Landmarks

 The medieval castle is one of the ten castles of Cyprus. It was built by the Byzantines around 1000 AD. Around the same period, a chapel was also built there. Richard the Lionheart is supposed to have married his fiancée Princess Berengaria of Navarre on this site after her ship was grounded nearby in 1191 as she accompanied him to the Third Crusade, on his way to Holy Land. The Castle was used as a prison between 1790 and 1940 and it now serves as a medieval museum. The collection that the museum provides covers the era of 400 – 1870 AD. A visitor can see numerous exhibits: cannons, wood carvings of the 17th and 18th century, paintings and tombstones, statues, suits of armour, coins, terracotta, metalware and pottery, glass and marble articrafts.
 The Archaeological Museum provides a very interesting collection of antiquities found in the district of Limassol, dating from the Neolithic Age to the Roman period. Some of the archaeological discoveries are: Stone axes of the Neolithic and Chalcolithic period, potteries and objects of the ancient cities of Curium and Amathus, as well as Roman terracottas, gold jewellery, coins, sculptures, columns, vases, earrings, rings, necklaces, marble statues etc.
 The Folk Art Museum is based in a preserved old house which contains a collection of Cypriot Folk Art of the last two centuries. Objects in the collection include: national costumes, tapestry, embroidery, wooden chests, waistcoats, men's jackets, necklaces, a variety of light clothes, town costumes, country tools etc. The museum was established in 1985. More than 500 exhibits are housed in its six rooms. The museum was awarded the Europa Nostra prize in 1989. Here, the visitor can study Cypriot culture through the hand-made exhibits.
 Public Garden is situated on the coastal road. It provides a great variety of vegetation: eucalyptus trees, pine trees and cypresses. Inside the garden, there is a small zoo. There, the visitor can see deer, moufflons, ostriches, pheasants, tigers, lions, monkeys, vultures, pelicans and other animals and different kinds of birds. Not far from the zoo there is the small natural history museum and the garden theatre that is reconstructed to host international groups.
 A series of public sculptures commissioned by the Limassol Municipality, can be found on the reclamation (now Twin Cities park), spanning  of seafront reclaimed land. The sculptures were created by Costas Dikefalos, Thodoros Papayiannis, Vassilis Vassili and Kyriakos Rokos from Greece, and Helene Black from Cyprus.
 Towers of Limassol BBC Relay, a powerful mediumwave transmitter.

Festivals

Limassol is famous in Cyprus for its festivals, like the Carnival and Wine Festival. The Limassol Carnival festival lasts for ten days, with jolly and amusing masquerading. This custom is very old, going back to pagan rituals. With the passage of time it has acquired a different, purely entertaining character, with a large, popular following. The festival starts with the entrance parade of the King Carnival, followed by a fancy-dress competition for children. During the Carnival parade in the main streets, large crowds from all over the island gather to watch the floats with the serenade and other masqueraded groups. Many fancy-dress balls and parties take place at many hotels every night.

During the first quarter of September, the great Wine Festival of Cyprus takes place in the Limassol Municipal Garden, every evening between 8.00 hrs – 23.00 hrs. During the festival the visitor has the chance to taste some of the best Cyprus wines, which are offered free of charge. On some evenings, various groups from Cyprus and abroad perform folk dancing and there are also choirs and others.

Other festivals are the Limassol Street Art Festival (late April / early May), Yermasogeia Flower Festival (May), Festival of the Flood (June), Shakespearean nights and Festival of Ancient Greek Drama.

Furthermore, the city of Limassol introduced the first Beer festival in July 2003. This is a three-day dance festival by the sea in the heart of the city centre. Visitors can drink a variety of Cypriot beers and imported beers. The entrance to the festival is free of charge and beers are sold at low prices, complemented by a mix of international music.

The sixth Junior Eurovision Song Contest was held in Limassol, in the Spyros Kyprianou Athletic Centre.

Sports

Apollon Limassol and AEL FC are the two major sport clubs in Limassol, which have football, basketball, and volleyball teams. In basketball, Apollon and AEL are very powerful teams. In football, both teams Apollon and AEL play in First Division. Aris Limassol is another football team which plays in First Division and like AEL is one of the founding teams of the Cyprus Football Association (KOP). AEL women volleyball teams is the permanent champion of Cyprus. There are also teams in athletics, bowling, cycling, and other sports.

The football stadium of Limassol is Tsirion, with capacity of 13 331, which hosts the three football teams of Limassol and in the past it hosted Cyprus national football team. It was used also for athletics. There are various other stadiums for other sports in Limassol.

The Apollon Limassol basketball stadium, hosted the 2003 FIBA Europe South Regional Challenge Cup Final Four. The two basketball teams of Limassol participated and AEL became the first Cypriot sport team to win a European Trophy. In 2006, Limassol hosted the FIBA Europe All Star Game in Spyros Kiprianou Sports Centre, as it had the year before. Also, in the Limassol district the Cyprus Rally was hosted for World Rally Championship and currently is organising the Intercontinental Rally Challenge.

The Limassol Marathon is part of an annual race series which takes place in Limassol. It was first run in 2006 and the ninth marathon was held on 29 March 2015. 2016 was a key year for Opap Limassol Marathon since the participation has broken any previous record with 13.000 runners from more than 50 countries around the world.

There are various races including a marathon, a half marathon, a  health Race, a  corporate race and a  children's fun run.

Limassol also has an independent civilian rugby union team, the Limassol Crusaders, who play at the AEK Achileas Stadium and participate in the Joint Services Rugby League. There is a professional handball team, APEN Agiou Athanasiou. An annual marathon event takes place each year in Limassol the Limassol International Marathon GSO.

Rowing and canoeing are rapidly becoming very popular in Limassol, due to the three nautical clubs in the city of Limassol. The Germasoyia dam is the place for both practising and competitions.

International relations

Twin towns — sister cities
Limassol is twinned with:

Notable residents
Nicos Anastasiades, Politician (Current President of the Republic of Cyprus)
George Achilleos, Athlete (Shooting - Olympian, former World titlist and World No.1 in Skeet)
Traphouse CY, Based Artist and Entrepreneur
Adamos Adamou, Politician (Member of the European Parliament)
Mustafa Akıncı, Politician
Stelios Arcadiou, Performance Artist
Marcos Baghdatis, Athlete (Tennis, career-high No.8 in ATP world singles rankings)
Ahmet Mithat Berberoğlu, Politician
Helene Black, Artist and curator
Michael Cacoyannis, Film director
Mustafa Çağatay, Politician
Ioannis Frangoudis, Athlete (Shooting - multi Olympic Medalist) / Hellenic Army Officer
John Fredriksen, Entrepreneur
İsmet Güney, Artist (Designer of the Cyprus Republic Flag)
Stelios Haji-Ioannou, Entrepreneur
Pavlos Kontides, Athlete (Sailing - Olympic Medalist)
Markos Kyprianou, Politician
Spyros Kyprianou, Politician (Former President of the Republic of Cyprus)
Leontios of Neapolis, Clergyman (Early medieval Bishop and Author)
Solon Michaelides, Composer and musicologist
Sotiris Moustakas, Actor
Loukia Nicolaidou, Artist
Theo Paphitis, Entrepreneur
Costas Philippou, Athlete (Mixed Martial Arts - UFC Middleweight Division)
Katy Stephanides, Artist
Marios Tokas, Composer

See also

References

Notes

Bibliography

 
 
Wolff, R L and Hazard, H W (Editor), 1969, A History of the Crusades, Volume II: The later Crusades, 1189–1311, University of Wisconsin Press,

External links

Limassol Official Guide
Limassol Municipality

 
Mediterranean port cities and towns in Cyprus
Municipalities in Limassol District